Zdeněk Podskalský (18 February 1923 – 29 October 1993) was a Czech film director and screenwriter. He directed 32 films between 1950 and 1987.

Selected filmography
 When the Woman Butts In (Kam čert nemůže) (1959)
 Muž, který stoupl v ceně (1967)
 A Night at Karlstein (Noc na Karlštejně) (1974)
 Ball Lightning (Kulový blesk) (1979)
 The Hit (Trhák) (1981)

External links

1923 births
1993 deaths
Czech film directors
Czech screenwriters
Male screenwriters
Czechoslovak film directors
20th-century screenwriters